Simmondley is a small village near the town of Glossop in Derbyshire, England. The population of the High Peak ward at the 2011 Census was 4,727.  It has one pub, the Hare and Hounds, in the south of the village at the top of Simmondley Lane. The pub is a part of the original farming community with the adjacent farmhouse, barn and stables converted into houses.  The Jubilee pub was built in 1977, in celebration of the Silver Jubilee of Elizabeth II. After 40 years, the brewery that owned the Jubilee sold it at auction; the buyer demolished the building in 2017 to build houses on the site and adjoining car park.

In August 1981 the Sorgro convenience store opened on Pennine Road. In recent years this has been a Spar, an Alldays and is currently run by The Co-operative Food. There is a post office, a Chinese takeaway, a dentist, a doctor, a chemist, a coffee shop and a hairdressers.

Many large housing projects have recently been completed in Simmondley, including a large housing estate off Valley Road that stretches towards the existing Manchester rail line.

Simmondley has a number of public areas, including: a children's play park area with swings and a centre climbing frame; an enclosed floodlit games court called the S.M.U.G.A (Simmondley Multi Use Games Area) with football nets and basketball hoops; open grassland around the estate mainly surrounding the Werneth Road area; a village green to the top of Simmondley with a public phone box, post box, plant pots and seating (during the Christmas period this is the location of the Simmondley Christmas Tree).

The housing developments south of the village have led to it being considered by some as a suburb of Glossop, rather than a separate settlement as it is contiguous with Glossop, although in recent years the local council has installed Simmondley signs at accesses to the village to mark that it has its own separate identity.

Simmondley is at the bottom of the so-called Monks' Road, a road used by the monks of Basingwerk Abbey to administer the abbey's estate. It leads to Charlesworth, Chisworth and Hayfield.

Schools and further education

Simmondley Pre-School
Simmondley pre-School has two sites for young children to attend. Natural Explorers occupy the old chapel on High Lane, in the original village part of Simmondley; age intake starts from 2 years old and goes up to 4 years old.

A second pre-school group is based in the grounds of Simmondley Primary School.

Simmondley Primary School
Simmondley Primary School is a primary school with over 300 pupils. The school is based on Pennine Road and was built in the 1970s by Derbyshire Education Authority using the CLASP (Consortium of Local Authorities Special Programme) design method, which was popular with councils for rapid builds between the 50s and 90s.

Transport

Bus
Simmondley is served by a number of bus routes throughout the week.

Train
There has been calls in recent years for Simmondley to be jointly served by a train station in Gamesley. So far no plans have been submitted.

Roads
The A6016 road runs north of Simmondley from the A57 to the A624.

See also
Listed buildings in Simmondley

References

External links

Villages in Derbyshire
Towns and villages of the Peak District
High Peak, Derbyshire